Coelomoron is a genus of cyanobacteria belonging to the family Merismopediaceae.

The species of this genus are found in Europe.

Species:

Coelomoron pusillum 
Coelomoron tropicale

References

Synechococcales
Cyanobacteria genera